India's Best Cinestar Ki Khoj is an Indian television series that premiered on Zee TV in 2004. It is a talent show for aspiring actors, and the first prize is the lead role in a film. Two winners, one male and one female, are crowned at the finale. The show returned for its second season in 2006 and third season in 2014 and fourth season in 2021.

Season 1
The winners of the first season were Sarwar Ahuja and Aditi Sharma.

Season 2
See Idea Zee Cinestars
Like season 1, season 2 also gave many stars to entertainment industry.
Winners of Zee Cinestars 2007
Piyush Chopra --- Group B
Sabina Sheema --- Group B(acted in many films) (http://www.missmalini.com/2013/12/11/exclusive-sabina-sheema-on-acting-with-dimple-kapadia-in-what-the-fish/)
Runner-up Zee Cinestars 2007
Gaurav Bajpai  --- Group B
Chandani Desai --- Group B

Contestants
 Group A
Aadil Sharma
Mamta Dutta
Manav Sharma
Pallavi Dutt
Mrityunjay Nigam
Piku Sharma
Rahul Manchanda
Rakhi Verma
Rizwan Sikander
Ritwika Ghoshal
Sahil Arora
Varsha Lodh
Rati Pandey
Varun Jaiswal

 Group B
Aalesha Syed
Ajay Chabria
Ankita Lokhande
Ashif
Chandani Desai
Gaurav Bajpai
Kanchan More
Hardik Soni
Minal Gorpade
Kartik Shetty
Rachel Gurjar
Prabhjot Dhillon
Surod Rizvi
Rohit Raghav
Piyush Chopra
Raj Saluja
Ruchika Babbar
Sabina Sheema
Vinay Kamble

Season 4

The fourth season of India's Best Cinestars Ki Khoj.

The Top 12 contestants in the competition are:

References

2004 Indian television series debuts
Zee TV original programming
Indian reality television series
Television series by Optimystix Entertainment